Västerhus is a locality situated in Örnsköldsvik Municipality, Västernorrland County, Sweden with 326 inhabitants in 2010.

References 

Populated places in Örnsköldsvik Municipality
Ångermanland